The Ark, in Ann Arbor, Michigan, is a nationally known acoustic and folk music venue.  It has been in existence in various locations since 1965. It currently seats about 400 and features more than 300 live performances each year.

Artists who have performed at The Ark include The Tallest Man on Earth, Lady Lamb, the Verve Pipe, John Paul White and His Band, Los Lonely Boys, the Milk Carton Kids, Mary Chapin Carpenter, Priscilla Ahn, Tom Paxton, Judy Collins, Arlo Guthrie, The Avett Brothers, Ani DiFranco, Birds of Chicago, The Proclaimers, Mandolin Orange, Ladysmith Black Mambazo, and Lissie.

The improv comedy group The Second City has performed there as well.

References

External links
 The Ark

Music of Ann Arbor, Michigan
Music venues in Michigan
Folk music venues
Music venues completed in 1965
1965 establishments in Michigan